Castrinenteria is a genus of tortoise mites in the family Uropodidae. There are at least two described species in Castrinenteria.

Species
These two species belong to the genus Castrinenteria:
 Castrinenteria castrii (Hirschmann, 1972)
 Castrinenteria loksai (Hirschmann, 1972)

References

Uropodidae
Articles created by Qbugbot